This is a list of Zeta Phi Beta chapters, both collegiate and graduate. Zeta Phi Beta is a historically African American sorority that was formed at Howard University in 1920.

Collegiate chapters 
Following is a list of the collegiate chapters of a Zeta Phi Beta sorority. Active chapters are indicated in bold. Inactive chapters are in italic.

Notes

Graduate chapters 
Following are the graduate chapters of Zeta Phi Beta. Active chapters are indicated in bold. Inactive chapters are in italic.

Notes

References 

Lists of chapters of United States student societies by society
Zeta Phi Beta
African-American organizations